Since 1994 Stef Lopazz, also known as LOPAZZ, has been part of the Heidelberg based HD800 team; he also runs the multimedia label 800achtspur, and is renowned as a film composer and Mix-Mastering-Engineer, having written, produced and engineered many internationally acclaimed records and films. In 2001, he had success with Redagain P when they remixed the Miami Vice & Magnum, P.I. themes; then, in 2003, Lopazz's self-titled EP was released by Output Recordings, followed by the singles 'Blood' (including a Tiefschwarz remix) and his first bona fide club hit ‘I Need Ya’ (later relicensed by French fashion label Colette). Its success led to Lopazz remixing Germany's biggest pop act Xavier Naidoo, while techno legend Sven Väth snapped up ‘I Need Ya’ for his Sound of the Fourth Season mix CD.  Stefan's relationship with Berlin-based Get Physical Music began when he was commissioned to remix Chelonis R. Jones' 'I Don't Know'. The label went on to issue Lopazz's own vocal track ‘Migracion’, which was subsequently remixed by Chilean producers Luciano and Ricardo Villalobos. Releases for Pokerflat, Cocoon and Compost Black Label followed, along with remixes and productions for the likes of Isolee, DJ T, M.A.N.D.Y., Matthew Dear and Imagination.

Discography ( Excerpts ) 
 1993: KnoB - Karlsunruhe Compilation ( Sony / Subway Karlsruhe )
 1994: Mason&Mesud - The Tapes 1-5 ( HD800Achtspur )
 1995: Mason-Mesud-Stevensen - Ambiente ( HD800Achtspur )
 1996: Mason&Mesud - Eigentlich wollte ich frei sein ( 800trak Kassettensampler 1 )
 1996: Mason-Mesud-Stevensen - Contraband ( HD800Achtspur )
 1997: Mason-Mesud-Stevensen - High Baby ( HD800Achtspur )
 1997: Jason Mason - Headhouse E.P. ( HD800Achtspur )
 1998: Mason-Mesud-Stevensen - Tonband ( HD800Achtspur )
 1999: Fou Fou - Popkomm E.P. ( HD800Achtspur )
 2000: Redagain P & LOPAZZ Magnum & Miami Vice Remixes ( Rams Horn )
 2001: Output 64 - Commodore Remixes ( Enduro/Ladomat )
 2001: Electuz - Compilation - LOPAZZ "Libertad"
 2002: Lounge Essenzen - Vol.2 ( DieLounge )
 2003: Nippon Connection - Compilation - LOPAZZ & A. Cortex "Chuo Ride..."
 2003: LOPAZZ - E.P. ( Freundinnen )
 2003: Soehne Mannheims - Mein Name ist Mensch - LOPAZZ Remix ( Universal Music )
 2004: LOPAZZ - Migracion ( Get Physical Music )
 2004: LOPAZZ - I Need Ya! ( Output Recordings )
 2004: Sven Vaeth In The Mix: The Sound Of The Fourth Season - LOPAZZ "I need ya!"
 2004: LOPAZZ - Blood ( Output Recordings )
 2005: Channel 4 - A Compilation Of Output Recordings - LOPAZZ "Blood"
 2005: LOPAZZ - Allemann ( Compost Records )
 2005: Fabric 23 - Ivan Smagghe - LOPAZZ "Blood"
 2005: Rio Reiser - Familienalbum 2 - LOPAZZ Remix ( Edel )
 2006: LOPAZZ - Lasergun ( Lasergun Records )
 2006: Compost Black Label Series Vol.1 - LOPAZZ: "C.o.D. + Estrella"
 2006: Floorfiller - Restless - LOPAZZ / Tiefscharz "Blood"-Remix
 2006: LOPAZZ - Ciegos ( Output Recordings )
 2006: Get Physical Vol. 2 - 4th Anniversary Label Compilation - Luciano "Migracion"-Remix
 2006: Lasergun Compilation 2 - LOPAZZ "Lasergun" + Bad Cop Bad Cop "Cube No.1"
 2006: M.A.N.D.Y. - At the Controls - LOPAZZ "share my rhythm"( Resist )
 2007: LOPAZZ - 12" Maxi mit Paul Ritch & Guillaume Remixes - 2 fast 4 u ( Get Physical Music )
 2007: Pomelo E.P. - 12" E.P. Thundercamel with Casio Casino ( Pomelo )
 2007: LOPAZZ - 2 fast 4 u ( Booka Shade K7 DJ Kicks )
 2007: LOPAZZ - Debütalbum CD & Vinyl, iTunes & Beatport-Exclusive - Kook Kook ( Get Physical Music )
 2007: A. Flatner & Deafny Moon - The Voice remix by LOPAZZ ( Circle Music Germany )
 2007: LOPAZZ - Share my rhythm ( Get Physical Music )
 2007: LOPAZZ - The Fact ( 5 years Get Physical Music Compilation )
 2007: Anthony Collins - De Palma remix by LOPAZZ ( Meerestief Schallplatten )
 2007: LOPAZZ - Chelonis Remix ( 5 years Get Physical Music Compilation )
 2007: LOPAZZ - E.P. mit Deafny Moon & S. Pascalidis F**ck Me! ( Gigolo Records )
 2007: Richard Bartz - Remix by LOPAZZ ( Kurbel records )
 2007: LOPAZZ - Migracion remix by F+M ( 5 years Get Physical Music Compilation )
 2008: LOPAZZ - Split Vinyl with Chloé/Pleinsoleil "Parau Api" ( Resopal Red )
 2008: GPM 100 Compilation CD & Vinyl - LOPAZZ vs. Heidi "Funkshovel" ( Get Physical Music )
 2008: Alex Flatner feat. LOPAZZ "Perfect Circles" ( Circle Music )
 2008: Full Body Workout Compilation No.4 CD & Vinyl "Live in Brazil" ( Get Physical Music )
 2008: LOPAZZ - 12" Maxi with Rex the Dog & Einzelkind Remixes - "We Are" ( Get Physical Music )
 2008: BAD COP BAD COP - 12" Maxi "Top of the cops"( Kahlwild )
 2008: Sonne Mond Sterne Compilation "Let´s do it in the club" ( BCB / Indigo )
 2008: Felix da Housecat - GU34 Milan Mix-CD "2 fast 4 u" ( Global Underground )
 2008: Trip to Asia - Remix CD - Berlin Philharmonic Orchestra ( Boomtown Media )
 2008: Fabric38 - Mixed by M.A.N.D.Y. - LOPAZZ "2 fast 4 u" J. Ganzer Remix
 2008: LOPAZZ - 12" Maxi with Jochen Trappe Remix - 24 hours ( Apparillo )
 2009: Alex Flatner & LOPAZZ "Make up your mind" ( Cocoon rec. )
 2009: Bronnt Industries Kapital - LOPAZZ Remix "Objects & Purpose" ( Get Physical Music )
 2009: Smalltown Collective - LOPAZZ Remix "Gruenwandler" ( Bacteria )
 2009: T. Becker feat. LOPAZZ "ltd.#012" ( Platzhirsch )
 2009: LOPAZZ & Casio Casino - Album: "Ambient Film Themes Vol.1" ( Get Physical Music & iTunes )
 2009: BAD COP BAD COP - 12" Maxi "Best of best of"( Kahlwild )
 2009: Lopazz feat. Eddie Zarook & The Fix "GPM 108 Credit Card Receipt" ( Get Physical Music )
 2009: Smalltown Collective - LOPAZZ Remix "Lotussaft" ( Session Deluxe Music )
 2009: Loco Dice The Lab Mix Cd "Perfect Circles" ( NRK )
 2009: DJ HELL / Gigolo 11 "Watermelon Man" ( International Deejay Gigolos )
 2009: Sven Vaeth "Sound of the 9th season" ( Cocoon rec. )
 2009: LOPAZZ & Casio Casino - Album: "Ambient Film Themes Vol.2" ( Get Physical Music & iTunes )
 2009: Lopazz & Eddie Zarook "Studerrevox Tape-Recordings" ( Circle Music )
 2009: Amnesia Compilation - LOPAZZ feat. Eddie Zarook "V-Point"
 2009: Alex Flatner & LOPAZZ "Perfect Circles Remixes" ( Circle Music )
 2009: M.A.N.D.Y. vs LOPAZZ "Full Of..." - Renaissance Compilation ( Renaissance )
 2009: Kasper Bjorke "Young again" - LOPAZZ & Zarook RMX  ( HFN )
 2009: BAD COP BAD COP - 12" Maxi "Rerooting to dusty"( MNX )
 2010: Raoul K - "Mystic Things" feat. LOPAZZ ( Baobab Secret )
 2010: Alex Flatner & LOPAZZ "Make up your mind Remixes" ( Cocoon rec. )
 2010: LOPAZZ & Friends feat. Imagination "GPM131" ( Get Physical Music )
 2011: LOPAZZ & Alex Flatner  „This“ ( Poker Flat )
 2011: LOPAZZ edited by SIS „Migracion“ & „Funkshovel feat. Heidi“ ( Get Physical Music )
 2011: Phreek „Passion“ - DJ T. Remix ( Compost Rec. )
 2011: DJ T. „The Pleasure Principle“ co-produced by LOPAZZ ( Get Physical Music )
 2011: LOPAZZ & Alex Flatner  „Dinosaurs" ( HFN )
 2011: LOPAZZ & Zarook „Bud“ ( HFN )
 2012: Jordan Lieb - lovework - Defected in the House ( DJ T. Remix )
 2012: LOPAZZ & Alex Flatner „Freedom of the heart“ ( Circle Music )
 2012: 10 Years Get Physical Music - LOPAZZ „Share my rhythm“ ( DJ T. Mix )
 2012: The House that Jack built - LOPAZZ „ Live in Brazil“ ( DJ T. Edit )
 2012: LOPAZZ vs M.A.N.D.Y. feat. Nick Maurer „Bookarest“ ( Watergate Compilation )
 2012: Circle Music Mixtape - LOPAZZ & Alex Flatner „Dislike“
 2012: Tigerstripes „This Man“ ( LOPAZZ & M.A.N.D.Y. Remix )
 2012: The Rapture „Children“ LOPAZZ Remix ( DFA )
 2012: LOPAZZ & Alex Flatner „Our Love E.P.“ ( Get Physical Music )
 2012: DJ T. „The Pleasure Principle“ Clubversions co-produced by LOPAZZ ( Get Physical Music )
 2012: M.A.N.D.Y. vs LOPAZZ feat. Nick Maurer
 2012: M.A.N.D.Y. vs LOPAZZ „Full of...“ Rework
 2012: Chelonis R. Jones „The Irritant“ ( LOPAZZ & Casio Casino RMX )
 2012: My Favourite Robot feat. Slok ( LOPAZZ & Casio Casino RMX )
 2013: LOPAZZ & Casio Casino „I feel love“ ( Get Physical Music )
 2013: Alex Niggemann - LOPAZZ & Flatner Remix - ( Poker Flat )
 2013: M.A.N.D.Y. vs LOPAZZ ( Cityfox )

Filmography 
 2012: Marco Polo Web-Doc ( AMP )
 2012: „Perfektes Promi-Dinner“ &  „GnTm“ ( LOPAZZ / DJ T. )
 2010: "Desertification"
 2010: "Perfektes Promi-Dinner"
 2010: Treasures of the World – Heritage of Mankind - Melaka & Georgetown, Malaysia
 2010: "Biofach 2010"
 2009: Food Hunter - Part 7-8 / In China
 2009: Bread for the World Campaign in Durban, South Africa
 2009: Bread for the World Campaign in Konso, Ethiopia
 2009: Treasures of the World – Heritage of Mankind - Aeolian Islands / Italy
 2008: Treasures of the World – Heritage of Mankind - Durmitor / Montenegro
 2008: Perfume Hunter - Der Duftjaeger/ arte
 2008: Bread for the World Campaign - "Yellow & Fair"
 2007: Treasures of the World – Heritage of Mankind - Essauoira / Morocco- Wo der Sand das Meer trifft
 2007: Profession: Food Hunter - Auf kulinarischer Schatzsuche in Asien 2007 Teil 1-5
 2006: Treasures of the World – Heritage of Mankind - Koguryo-Graeber / Nordkorea- Kampfbereit bis in alle Ewigkeit
 2006: Treasures of the World – Heritage of Mankind - Merv / Turkmenistan - Ruinen einer Koenigsstadt
 2006: Treasures of the World – Heritage of Mankind - Mongolei - Orchon Tal - Steine, Stupas, Staedte
 2006: Treasures of the World – Heritage of Mankind - Macau / China
 2005: Laos - Wassertaxi zur Koenigsstadt
 2005: Profession: Food Hunter - Auf kulinarischer Schatzsuche in Asien
 2005: Treasures of the World – Heritage of Mankind - Victoria Terminus / Victoria Bahnhof in Mumbai
 2005: Reinhold Messner in der Mongolei - Mit Sohn Simon bei den Tuwa–Nomaden in der Mongolei
 2005: Treasures of the World – Heritage of Mankind - Turkestan, Pilgerfahrt nach Turkestan
 2004: Indien Maritime - Teil 1-3 & ARTE Beitrag für Lola
 2004: Treasures of the World – Heritage of Mankind - Altstadt Tunis, Mausoleum des Hodscha Ahmed Yasawi
 2004: Treasures of the World – Heritage of Mankind - Amalfi-Kueste Italien, Alles wie gemalt
 2003: GEO 360 Grad - Mission Nordkorea
 2003: Treasures of the World – Heritage of Mankind - Accra
 2003: Treasures of the World – Heritage of Mankind - Ashantiland
 2003: Treasures of the World – Heritage of Mankind - Samarkand
 2003: Treasures of the World – Heritage of Mankind - Hội An
 2002: Treasures of the World – Heritage of Mankind - Vigan
 2002: Treasures of the World – Heritage of Mankind - Dhofar
 2002: Treasures of the World – Heritage of Mankind - Huế
 2002: Jeder Wind hat seine Reise - Teil 1-3
 2001: Treasures of the World – Heritage of Mankind - Kathmandu-Tal
 2001: Treasures of the World – Heritage of Mankind - Luang Prabang
 2001: Treasures of the World – Heritage of Mankind - Banaue
 2001: Treasures of the World – Heritage of Mankind - Halong-Bucht
 2000: Treasures of the World – Heritage of Mankind - Buchara - Perle an der Seidenstrasse
 2000: Drei Wege nach Samarkand - Die Spur des Propheten
 1999: Treasures of the World – Heritage of Mankind - Ghadames
 1999: Treasures of the World – Heritage of Mankind - Leptis Magna

Sources 
 http://www.lopazz.com
 http://www.myspace.com/lopazz
 http://www.achtspur.com
 http://www.schaetze-der-welt.de

References

Club DJs
Remixers
Living people
German film score composers
Male film score composers
German male composers
German electronic musicians
German dance musicians
Heidelberg University alumni
Year of birth missing (living people)